Sybra moorei is a species of beetle in the family Cerambycidae. It was described by Gahan in 1894.

References

moorei
Beetles described in 1894